Tenting Tonight on the Old Camp Ground is a 1943 American Western film directed by Lewis D. Collins and written by Elizabeth Beecher. The film stars Johnny Mack Brown, Tex Ritter, Fuzzy Knight, Jennifer Holt, John Elliott and Earle Hodgins. The film was released on February 5, 1943, by Universal Pictures.

Plot

Cast        
Johnny Mack Brown as Wade Benson
Tex Ritter as Bob Courtney
Fuzzy Knight as Si Dugan
Jennifer Holt as Kay Randolph
John Elliott as Inspector Talbot
Earle Hodgins as Judge Higgins
Rex Lease as Zeke Larkin
Lane Chandler as Duke Merrick
Alan Bridge as Matt Warner
Dennis Moore as Ed Randolph
Tom London as Henchman Pete
Bud Osborne as Deputy Snell
Lynton Brent Sheriff
Reed Howes as Smoke Dawson
George Plues as Stage Driver
Hank Worden as Sleepy Martin
Jimmy Wakely as Jimmy 
Johnny Bond as Singer
Scotty Harrel as Singer

References

External links
 

1943 films
1940s English-language films
American Western (genre) films
1943 Western (genre) films
Universal Pictures films
Films directed by Lewis D. Collins
American black-and-white films
Films with screenplays by Harry L. Fraser
1940s American films